

The Aerospace General Mini-Copter was a miniature helicopter designed to be air-dropped to U.S. military pilots stranded behind enemy lines or in otherwise inaccessible areas.

At its most basic, the Mini-Copter was simply made up of fuel tanks and a rotor unit strapped to the pilot. A slightly more conventional configuration was also developed, with these units attached to a steel framework that also provided a seat for the pilot. In both these versions, power was provided by rocket motors on the rotor tips.

A third variation added a piston engine and pusher propeller to the design, allowing it to fly as an autogyro without the tip rockets once sufficient forward speed had been achieved.

Design work started in 1972, with first flight on 31 March 1973. The three prototype vehicles were tested by the US Navy from late 1974 to 1977, then transferred to the US Army in 1978 for testing under a $409,000 program named "Individual Tactical Air Vehicle".

Specifications

References

 
 
 US Patent 4071206 

1970s United States military rescue aircraft
1970s United States helicopters